Kyzyltas is a range of mountains in Aktogay District, Karaganda Region, Kazakhstan.

The nearest inhabited place is Zhanatogan (Жаңатоған), Karkaraly District.

Geography 
Kyzyltas is one of the ranges of the southern part of the Kazakh Upland system (Saryarka). The slightly higher Kyzylarai massif rises to the southeast and the Karkaraly and Kent mountain ranges lie to the northeast. The ridges of the Kyzyltas are deeply dissected by gorges, valleys and ravines. The Nura river has its sources in the range and flows northwards and then westwards into Lake Tengiz. Its main tributary Sherubaynura also has its sources in Kyzyltas. Other rivers originating in the range are the Zhamshi, Zharly and Tokrau; the latter flows southwards towards Lake Balkhash, but its waters get lost in the semidesert sands.

Other important peaks are Kimatas (Қиматас) —, Korpetai (Көрпетай) —, Zhantau (Жантау) —, Sorang (Сораң) —, Kyzyltas (peak) —, Zhylandy (Жыланды) —, Keregetas (Керегетас) —, Nurtai (Нұртай) —, Otar (Отар) —, Saryzhol (Сарыжол) —, Akshoky (Ақшоқы) —, Akkemer (Ақкемер) —, Kyzyladyr (Қызыладыр) — and Berikkara (Берікқара) —.

Flora
Vegetation on the range is sparse, only some of the slopes and valleys have tree growth, including birch, aspen and willow. There are areas of low vegetation made up of grasses and arid steppe shrubs, as well as sedges, such as fescue and sage fescue.

See also
Geography of Kazakhstan

References

External links
Visit Kazakhstan
Kazakh Uplands